Utimuni was a warrior of the Zulu tribe and nephew of the king Shaka. He commanded one of his uncle's regiments during the Ndwandwe–Zulu War.

References

19th-century African people
History of KwaZulu-Natal
People from KwaZulu-Natal
Zulu people